The 2015 Philippine Basketball Association (PBA) Governors' Cup, also known as the 2015 PLDT Home TVolution-PBA Governors' Cup for sponsorship reasons, was the third and last conference of the 2014–15 PBA season. The tournament began on May 5, 2015 and ended on July 17, 2015.

Format
The tournament format for this conference is as follows:
 Single-round robin eliminations; 11 games per team; Teams are then seeded by basis on win–loss records. 
Top eight teams will advance to the quarterfinals. Ties are broken among head-to-head records of the tied teams.
Quarterfinals (higher seed with the twice-to-beat advantage):
QF1: #1 seed vs #8 seed
QF2: #2 seed vs #7 seed
QF3: #3 seed vs #6 seed
QF4: #4 seed vs #5 seed
Semifinals (best-of-5 series):
SF1: QF1 vs. QF4 winners
SF2: QF2 vs. QF3 winners
Finals (best-of-7 series)
Winners of the semifinals

Elimination round

Team standings

Schedule

Results

Bracket

Quarterfinals

(1) Alaska vs. (8) Barangay Ginebra

(2) San Miguel vs. (7) Meralco

(3) Rain or Shine vs. (6) Barako Bull

(4) GlobalPort vs. (5) Star

Semifinals

(1) Alaska vs. (5) Star

(2) San Miguel vs. (3) Rain or Shine

Finals

Awards

Conference
Best Player of the Conference: June Mar Fajardo (San Miguel Beermen)
Best Import of the Conference: Romeo Travis (Alaska Aces)
Finals MVP: June Mar Fajardo (San Miguel Beermen)

Players of the Week

Imports 
The following is the list of imports, which had played for their respective teams at least once, with the returning imports in italics. Highlighted in gold are the imports who stayed with their respective teams for the whole conference. Players with an asterisk indicates the Asian imports.

Import handicapping

Philippine Cup final ranking comprises 60% of the points, while the elimination round ranking in the Commissioner's Cup is 40%. The four teams with most points gets to have an import of unlimited height.

References

PBA Governors' Cup
Governors' Cup